Air Combat Emulator may refer to:
 Ace 1 (video game) or Air Combat Emulator I, a 1985 combat flight simulator
 Ace 2 (video game) or Air Combat Emulator II, a 1987 combat flight simulator

See also
 ACE (disambiguation)
 Combat flight simulation game
 Field training exercise
 Flight simulator
 Microsoft Combat Flight Simulator
 Military wargaming
 Wargame